Siri Waterfall, formerly called Santa Maria Waterfall,  is a  waterfall located about 3 km inland from the eastern coast of the island of Gaua in northern Vanuatu.

The supply of water to the waterfall is from Lake Letas.  This lake is a large freshwater lake located in the crater at the centre of the volcanic island, about 600 meters above sea level.  Water flows from the lake 3 km east to the top of Siri Waterfall.  After the waterfall, the water flows as a large stream, called Mbe Solomul River (formerly Namang), for another 3 km before it reaches the sea.  The large stream is known as "Big Water".

A rough estimate of the water flow rate (during the dry season month of August 2006) was approximately 5 cubic metres per second.

Waterfalls of Vanuatu